WBYB (98.3 MHz) is a radio station licensed to Cleveland, Mississippi. The station broadcasts an oldies format branded as Oldies 98.3.

The station formerly operated as WDFX, an owned-and-operated outlet of American Family Radio. In 2017, the station was sold by the American Family Association to John and Lynn Allen for $150,000; John is a stakeholder in Delta Radio Networks, which operates several stations in northwest Mississippi. The acquisition by the Allens was consummated on December 7, 2017, at which point the station flipped to an oldies format and changed its call sign to WBYB.

The station broadcasts the syndicated "Murphy, Sam & Jodi" morning show as well as John Tesh's "Music & Intelligence for Your Life."  "Dick Bartley's Rock & Roll's Greatest Hits" is featured on the weekend.

References

External links

Oldies radio stations in the United States
BYB
Radio stations established in 1994
1994 establishments in Mississippi